

Legend

List

References

1996-97